Győr county (in Hungarian: Győr (vár)megye) was an administrative county (comitatus) of the Kingdom of Hungary, situated mostly on the right (south) side of the Danube river. Its territory is now part of Hungary, except seven villages on the left side of the Danube which belong to Slovakia. The capital of the county was the city of Győr.

Geography
Győr county shared borders with the counties Moson, Pozsony, Komárom, Veszprém and Sopron. The rivers Danube, and Rába run through the county. Its area was 1534 km2 around 1910.

History
The Győr comitatus arose as one of the first comitatus of the Kingdom of Hungary. Its southern part was conquered by the Ottoman Empire in 1543. The Ottoman Empire meant a constant threat to the Habsburg Kingdom of Hungary therefore the Habsburg kings divided the kingdom's remaining territory into captaincies. The Captaincy of Győr was located between lake Balaton and river Danube. In 1594, the Ottomans captured the city Győr, however an Habsburg-Hungarian army reconquered it in 1598. The other parts of Győr County were liberated from Ottoman rule in the 1680s.

In 1920 the Treaty of Trianon assigned a very small part of the territory of the county to Czechoslovakia. The rest stayed in Hungary and merged with the eastern part of Moson county and a very small part of Pozsony county to form Győr-Moson-Pozsony county in 1923.

The county became abolished after World War II and Győr-Moson county was created instead. In 1950, Sopron county merged with Győr-Moson county to form Győr-Sopron county. This county was renamed to Győr-Moson-Sopron in 1990. The part of the county north of the river Danube is now in Slovakia, Trnava Region.

Demographics

1900

In 1900, the county had a population of 126,188 people and was composed of the following linguistic communities:

Total:

 Hungarian: 122,925 (97.4%)
 German: 2,465 (2.0%)
 Slovak: 216 (0.2%)
 Croatian: 151 (0.1%)
 Serbian: 27 (0.0%)
 Romanian: 16 (0.0%)
 Ruthenian: 2 (0.0%)
 Other or unknown: 386 (0.3%)

According to the census of 1900, the county was composed of the following religious communities:

Total:

 Roman Catholic: 94,939 (75.2%)
 Lutheran: 15,902 (12.6%)
 Calvinist: 8,800 (7.0%)
 Jewish: 6,403 (5.1%)
 Greek Orthodox: 70 (0.0%)
 Greek Catholic: 61 (0.0%)
 Unitarian: 9 (0.0%)
 Other or unknown: 4 (0.0%)

1910
In 1910, the county had a population of 136,295 people and was composed of the following linguistic communities:

Total:

 Hungarian: 132,991 (97.6%)
 German: 2,023 (1.5%)
 Slovak: 609 (0.5%)
 Croatian: 109 (0.0%)
 Serbian: 17 (0.0%)
 Romanian: 17 (0.0%)
 Ruthenian: 2 (0.0%)
 Other or unknown: 527 (0.4%)

According to the census of 1910, the county was composed of the following religious communities:

Total:

 Roman Catholic: 103,292 (75.8%)
 Lutheran: 16,656 (12.2%)
 Calvinist: 9,080 (6.7%)
 Jewish: 7,046 (5.2%)
 Greek Catholic: 130 (0.0%)
 Greek Orthodox: 55 (0.0%)
 Unitarian: 18 (0.0%)
 Other or unknown: 18 (0.0%)

Subdivisions
In the early 20th century, the subdivisions of Győr county were:

References

States and territories established in 1790
States and territories disestablished in 1785
States and territories disestablished in 1920
States and territories disestablished in 1923
Counties in the Kingdom of Hungary
Divided regions